The Latvian Third League, currently known for sponsorship reasons as Dali Dali 3.līga, is the fourth tier of football in Latvia and is organised by the Latvian Football Federation.

History

In 2019, the Latvian Football Federation changed the Latvian football league system by expanding it to a fourth tier, the Third League. The aim was to greatly reduce the number of teams in the Second League and increase the prestige of the higher levels of the league system. Due to the COVID-19 pandemic in Latvia, the inaugural 2020 season did not fully proceed as planned, and the first edition of the Third League held in accordance with the newly established format took place in 2021.

Competition format

Regional stage
There are four regional divisions (West, Center, North, and East) in the Third League, each containing an approximated 10 teams (though the exact number in each division varies by season), which must play home and away games against their regional opponents. From each region, two teams advance to the promotion round, whereas the other teams do not continue the season. This stage of the league is typically contested from April to September.

As this is the lowest level of Latvian football, no relegation takes place within the league.

Promotion stage
The promotion round involves additional matches between the top two teams of each regional division, allowing four of the best teams to be promoted to the Second League at the conclusion of the season. This takes place in a knockout format, starting from the quarterfinals. Semi-finalists are automatically promoted to the Second League for next season, and contest additional matches in order to determine the exact placement of each team and the league winners.

Past Third League winners

References

External links 
 Latvian Football Federation website
 Latvian Third League website

4
Fourth level football leagues in Europe